Yolo is a village and seat of the commune of Diédougou in the Cercle of Ségou in the Ségou Region of southern-central Mali. The village lies 80 km east-northeast of Ségou.

References

Populated places in Ségou Region